The Thanhouser Company is credited as having released 82 films in 1910. Of these films several are of unknown or questionable status. Roosevelt's Return may not have been shot or released and Alaska's Adieu to Winter is unlikely to have been filmed by the company.

Releases

Notes

References 

Thanhouser Company